Antoni Adamski (29 May 1932 – 26 March 2001) was a Polish field hockey player who competed in the 1952 Summer Olympics.

He was part of the Polish field hockey team, which competed in the Olympic tournament. He played as halfback in two matches: Poland's only match in the main tournament and one match in the consolation tournament.

External links
 
profile

Polish male field hockey players
Olympic field hockey players of Poland
Field hockey players at the 1952 Summer Olympics
1932 births
2001 deaths
People from Gniezno County
Sportspeople from Greater Poland Voivodeship